Mohammadabad (also Romanized as Moḩammadābād) is a village in Bagh Safa Rural District, Sarchehan District, Bavanat County, Fars Province, Iran. At the 2006 census, its population was 93, in 19 families.

References 

Populated places in Sarchehan County